For the results of the Guinea national football team, see:

Guinea national football team results (1962–2019)
Guinea national football team results (2020–present)